A bullet journal (sometimes known as a BuJo) is a method of personal organization developed by designer Ryder Carroll. The system organizes scheduling, reminders, to-do lists, brainstorming, and other organizational tasks into a single notebook. The name "bullet journal" comes from the use of abbreviated bullet points to log information, but it also partially comes from the use of dot journals, which are gridded using dots rather than lines. First shared with the public in 2013, it has become a popular organization method, garnering significant attention on Kickstarter, Instagram, Facebook, YouTube, and Pinterest.

Method 
Bullet journals are usually handwritten and kept in a single notebook. The core tools of a bullet journal are:

 an index
 rapid logging
 logs
 collections
 migration

The index functions like the index to a book, or a table of contents, pointing to where information on different topics is located.

Rapid logging uses a system of symbols (e.g. dashes, asterisks, circles, etc.) to simplify, abbreviate and organize information. These symbols can be explained in a key, typically located in the front of the journal. Information can be organized into tasks, events, notes, and other categories.

Logs are to-do lists, organized on different time scales, including daily, weekly, monthly, and future logs. Logs are often called spreads since they typically spread across two adjacent pages.

Collections make up the bulk of a bullet journal, and organize information by content – these can be logs, lists, trackers, etc. Other popular collections include habit and mood trackers, fitness or diet trackers, a list of books to read, restaurants to try, etc.

Described as the "cornerstone" of bullet journaling, migration is the practice of periodically updating lists to new lists, such as carrying over unfinished tasks from one month's log to the next. This helps users stay organized, productive, and on task by allowing them to prioritize what things need to get done, and what can be placed on hold. Migration can also refer to the process of moving into a new notebook.

Tools 
The method requires a pen or pencil and a notebook, though many users are more elaborate. Commercially produced notebooks exist that are designed for bullet journaling, but any blank notebook will suffice. Users who focus on the creative element may use a variety of supplies, including a ruler, colored pens, markers, pencils, stickers, stencils, washi tape, etc.

The bullet journal system aims to provide a framework for users to plan out their lives and increase productivity. Inherent to the bullet journaling system is flexibility – there is plenty of room for users to customize the system to their needs.

Reception 
Proponents describe the bullet journal as both an effective planning method and a "creative outlet" with a focus on "simplicity and clarity."

Styles 

Since the introduction of the original bullet journal method, the online community has morphed the bullet journal into all different styles: minimalistic, artsy, doodle, super-organized, and scrapbook, to name a few. What differentiates styles is how elaborate pages are, whether that's in terms of content or appearance, or in how the user approaches the system. For example, the bullet journal may be used for its functionality, and organization, or as an outlet for creativity.

Digital bullet journaling has also become popular. Although bullet journaling is traditionally done with pen and paper, many users have created digital bullet journals using a variety of note-taking apps or apps designed specifically for digital bullet journaling.

Uses 
A bullet journal is a way to schedule by day, week, month, or year; it can also be used to keep track of progress on various tasks. It may be used as a medium for meditation, as an artistic outlet, and/or as a diary. Many people seek inspiration on social media, searching for users who post their own creations in the hopes of inspiring others. A BuJo can be used as an academic planner by holding records of assignments and deadlines. It can also be used to track mental health with pages such as mood and habit trackers. If maintained over a long period of time, it may also be used to reflect on memories and past events.

School 
Many students have taken up bullet journaling to help them succeed in all levels of school – high school, college, graduate, etc. On YouTube, there are many "study with me" videos, which feature YouTubers studying, as well as sharing tips, tricks, and favorite supplies. Closely related are studygrams, which are Instagram accounts dedicated to studying and taking effective, organized, and aesthetically pleasing notes. Bullet journaling has been featured in many of these videos as a way to get organized and stay productive in school. In 2019, Study with Me: Effective Bullet Journaling Techniques, Habits, and Hacks To Be Successful, Productive, and Organized – With Special Strategies for Mathematics, Science, History, Languages, and More by Jasmine Shao and Alyssa Jagan was published. This book was inspired by the popular "study with me" or "studygram" phenomenon.

Work 
Proponents of the bullet journal system have also used it to organize their work lives and careers since the system promotes productivity and is easily customizable. Bullet journals can be used to keep track of tasks, schedule appointments and meetings, manage projects, take notes, track how time is being spent, etc. Some have even used it to keep track of goals for annual reviews. Thousands of videos can be found on YouTube on how to use a bullet journal for work.

Finances 
People also use bullet journals to track or log finances, as they can be used to track spending or savings goals.

Mental health 
Bullet journaling to manage mental health has also become very popular, due to the tracking features of the bullet journaling system. Recording information over time in one place, it can lead to insights into users' moods, habits, mental health triggers, and more. Some people use bullet journals for goal setting or gratitude logs. Additionally, a bullet journal can be a designated outlet to work through strong emotions or difficult times. The act of writing things down can help people get thoughts out of their heads and make them become more objective and less stressed.

History 
Ryder Carroll began looking for a simple method of personal organization in college in the late 1990s. Diagnosed with attention deficit disorder as a child, he wanted a system to help "move past his learning disabilities." By the time he graduated from college, he had devised the bullet journal method. A friend encouraged him to share his method, and he began sharing it online in 2013. It attracted attention on social media, earning $80,000 in Kickstarter funding to create a centralized online community of users. It was the subject of over 3 million Instagram posts by December 2018. The method has been influenced by Carroll's experience as an app, web, and game designer, as well as by his interest in scrapbooking.

Carroll gave a TED talk about bullet journaling at the 2017 TEDxYale event, titled "How to declutter your mind  – keep a journal." Carroll also published a book on the system, The Bullet Journal Method, in 2018.

Economic impact 
Since the introduction of bullet journaling, its growing popularity has contributed to an increase in sales of traditional stationery products, such as notebooks, pens, etc. As of 2018, there was an 18% increase in the sale of notebooks in the US compared to the year before. There was also an increase ranging from 5% to 17% in the sale of various types of pens.

See also 
 Org-mode with more advanced syntax

References

External links 
 Official website

Personal information managers
Diaries